Villegas may refer to:

People
Antonio Villegas (1928–1984), Filipino mayor
Benito Villegas (1877–1952), Argentine chess player
Bernardo Villegas, Filipino writer
Camilo Villegas (born 1982), Colombian golfer
Carey Villegas, visual effects artist
Conrado Villegas (1841–1884), Argentine general
Constant Villegas (born 1986), French rugby league player
Daniel Cosío Villegas (1898–1976), Mexican economist, essayist, historian and diplomat
Dan Villegas, Filipino cinematographer and director
David Villegas, better known as Dave Nada, Ecuadorian-American DJ and producer
David Alex Villegas (born 1995), better known as Skinnyfromthe9, American rapper
Diego Osorio Villegas (1540–1601), Spanish governor of Venezuela
Ernesto Villegas (born 1970), Venezuelan journalist and politician
Eruviel Ávila Villegas (born 1969), Mexican politician
Evangelina Villegas (born 1924), Mexican biochemist
Francisco Gil Villegas (born 1953), Mexican academic and publisher
Guillermo Tell Villegas (1823–1907), Venezuelan politician and President of Venezuela
Guillermo Tell Villegas Pulido (1854–1949), Venezuelan lawyer, journalist and politician
Harry "Pombo" Villegas (born 1940), Cuban Communist revolutionary
Ismael Villegas (born 1976), Puerto Rican baseball player
Jaime Villegas (born 1950), Honduran footballer
Jasmine Villegas (born 1993), American singer
Jason Villegas (born 1977), American artist
Javier Naranjo Villegas (1919–2014), Colombian Roman Catholic prelate
José Villegas (1934–2021), Mexican footballer
Juan Villegas, Argentine actor
Lorenza Villegas Restrepo (1892–1960), Colombian First Lady
Luis Villegas (born 1969), American guitarist
Manuel Delgado Villegas (1943–1998), Spanish serial killer
Manuel Villegas Piñateli (died 1752), member of the Royal Spanish Academy
Micaela Villegas (1748–1819), Peruvian actress
Petter Villegas (born 1975), Ecuador-born Puerto Rican footballer
Raimundo Villegas (1931 - 2014), Venezuelan scientist
Socrates B. Villegas (born 1960), Filipino Roman Catholic archbishop
Thairo Estrada Villegas (born 1996), Venezuelan  Major League Baseball player for the San Francisco Giants
Vladimir Villegas (born 1961), Venezuelan journalist and politician
Ysmael R. Villegas (1924–1945), American Medal of Honor recipient

Other
Villegas, Province of Burgos, municipality and village in Castile and León, Spain
Río Villegas, village and municipality in Río Negro Province, Argentina
CD Villegas, Spanish football club

See also
General Villegas, town in Buenos Aires Province, Argentina
Alejandro Végh Villegas (1928–2017), Uruguayan economist
Pablo Sainz Villegas (born 1977), Spanish classical guitarist
de Villegas (disambiguation)

Spanish-language surnames